Gaussia is a genus of copepods. The genus contains bioluminescent species. The genus Gaussia contains the following species:
Gaussia asymmetrica T. K. S. Björnberg & Campaner, 1988
Gaussia gadusae Sarkar, 2004
Gaussia intermedia Defaye, 1998
Gaussia melanotica Wolfenden, 1905
Gaussia princeps (T. Scott, 1894) (type species)
Gaussia sewelli Saraswathy, 1973

References

External links

Calanoida
Bioluminescent copepods
Copepod genera